Elections to Langbaurgh Borough Council took place in 1987. The whole council was up for election. The Labour Party won the most seats but there was no overall control of the council.

Election result

Ward Results

Bankside

Belmont

Brotton

Church Lane

Coatham

Dormanstown

Eston

Grangetown

Guisborough

Hutton

Kirkleatham

Lockwood

Loftus

Longbeck

Newcomen

Normanby

Ormesby

Overfields

Redcar

Saltburn

Skelton

Skinningrove

South Bank

St. Germains

Teesville

West Dyke

References

1987 English local elections
1987
1980s in North Yorkshire